The 1969 Oklahoma State Cowboys football team represented Oklahoma State University in the Big Eight Conference during the 1969 NCAA University Division football season. In their first season under head coach Floyd Gass, the Cowboys compiled a 5–5 record (3–4 against conference opponents), tied for fifth place in the conference, and were outscored by opponents by a combined total of 200 to 197.

On offense, the 1969 team averaged 19.7 points scored, 132.0 rushing yards, and 164.1 passing yards per game.  On defense, the team allowed an average of 20.0 points scored, 188.0 rushing yards, and 155.3 passing yards per game. The team's statistical leaders included Bob Deerinwater with 587 rushing yards, Bob Cutburth with 1,593 passing yards, and Hermann Eben with 733 receiving yards and 42 points scored.

Offensive lineman John Ward was selected by the AFCA, FWAA, and Kodak as a first-team All-American. Ward, middle guard John Little, halfback Benny Goodwin, and tackle Jerry Sherk were selected as first-team All-Big Eight Conference players. Linebacker Gary Darnell set a single-game Oklahoma State record with 27 tackles against Texas Tech on October 4, 1969. John Gates set the Oklahoma State record for interceptions in a season with 8.

The team played its home games at Lewis Field in Stillwater, Oklahoma.

Schedule

After the season

The 1970 NFL Draft was held on January 27–28, 1970. The following Cowboys were selected.

References

Oklahoma State
Oklahoma State Cowboys football seasons
Oklahoma State Cowboys football